Faceless One may refer to:

A fictional character in the Age of Worms Adventure Path for Dungeons & Dragons
A fictional character which is a member of the  Kt'kn race in Marvel Comics
A fictional character in the Skulduggery Pleasant series of novels
A fictional race within World of Warcraft